Burma competed at the 1960 Summer Olympics in Rome, Italy.

Athletics

Men
Track & road events

Boxing

Men

Sailing

Open

Swimming

Men

Weightlifting

Men

References
Official Olympic Reports

Nations at the 1960 Summer Olympics
1960
1960 in Burmese sport